is a former Nippon Professional Baseball infielder.

In 2001, his pinch hit walk-off grand slam erased a 3-run deficit in the bottom of the ninth inning and secured the pennant for the Osaka Kintetsu Buffaloes.

External links

1972 births
Living people
Baseball people from Hyōgo Prefecture
Nihon University alumni
Japanese baseball players
Nippon Professional Baseball infielders
Hanshin Tigers players
Osaka Kintetsu Buffaloes players
Orix Buffaloes players
Japanese baseball coaches
Nippon Professional Baseball coaches